The 2006–07 Top 14 competition was the 108th French domestic rugby union club competition operated by the Ligue Nationale de Rugby (LNR) and the 2nd using the name Top 14.  Biarritz were out to defend their crown, after their defeat of Toulouse in the 2005–06 Top 14 final.   New teams to the league included Albi and Montauban who were promoted from 2004–05 Pro D2, replacing relegated sides Toulon and Pau. During the season attendance records in the league were once again broken with 79,741 attending the Round 19 clash between Stade Français and Toulouse at the Stade de France, and over 2 million supporters attended games across the campaign.

In the league Stade Français jumped out to an early lead, winning their first nine matches. Although they faded somewhat as the season went on, they held on to top the regular-season ladder.  Toulouse and Clermont each entered the final week with a chance to top the ladder, but Stade Français' win over Agen (without a bonus point) made it impossible for Clermont to overtake them, while Toulouse failed to secure the bonus point in their win over Bourgoin that would have made it possible for them to pip the Parisians for the top seed. The last playoff berth came down to the last round between Biarritz and Perpignan, with Biarritz securing fourth place in style with a bonus-point win over Castres.

The final Heineken Cup berth came down to the last round as well, with Bourgoin holding off the challenge of Top 14 newcomers Montauban.  The relegation battle came down to the last week. Narbone had been assured of the drop after Round 25, while any of six other clubs were in mathematical danger of the drop going into the final week. In the end, Agen, who were next-to-last entering the final week, were consigned to the drop by league leaders Stade Français.  Both clubs would be relegated to the 2007–08 Pro D2.

The play-offs saw Stade Français and Clermont win their respective semi-finals to qualify for the final.  In the end it was Stade Français who lifted the Bouclier de Brennus as Top 14 champions for the 13th time in the club's history, beating Clermont 23–18 at the Stade de France.

Teams

Number of teams by regions

Table

The seventh-place team would have received a Heineken Cup place if a French club had advanced farther in that season's Heineken Cup than any club from England or Italy. However, the quarterfinal losses of Biarritz and Stade Français, the last two remaining French sides in the 2006–07 Heineken Cup, to English sides Northampton Saints and Leicester Tigers, meant that the "extra" Heineken Cup place would go to England. (The remaining two semifinalists were another English side, eventual winners London Wasps, and Welsh side Llanelli Scarlets.)

The 2007-08 Heineken Cup was in doubt earlier this season. French clubs announced plans to boycott the competition, and the English PRL clubs joined them, demanding a financial stake in the competition from the RFU.  However, recent negotiations have ensured that top teams from both countries will now play.

Fixtures & Results

Round 1

Round 2

Round 3

Round 4

Round 5

Round 6

Round 7

Round 8

Round 9

Round 10

Round 11

Round 12

Round 13

Round 14

Round 15

Round 16

Round 17

Round 18

Round 19

Round 20

Round 21

Round 22

Round 23

Round 24

Round 25

Round 26

Knock-out stages

Semi-finals

Final

Leading scorers
 Note that points scorers includes tries as well as conversions, penalties and drop goals.

Top points scorers

Top try scorers

Attendances

 Attendances do not include the semi-finals or final as these are at neutral venues.

See also
 2006–07 Heineken Cup
 2006–07 Rugby Pro D2 season

Notes

References

External links
  Ligue Nationale de Rugby - Official website
 Top 14 on Planetrugby.com

Top 14 seasons
 
France